Gyula Borka (born 3 June 1959 in Budapest, Hungary) is a retired Hungarian athlete, who specialized in the long-distance running events. He represented his native European country at the 1992 Summer Olympics in Barcelona (Spain), finishing in 38th place (2:20:46).

Achievements

He still holds an old Hungary national record of 25.000 meters, with a time of 1:16:09, set in La Fleche (France) in 1992.
He was six times Hungary national champion Marathon-running teams, and three times champion field-running teams.

Family
Father: Julius Borka (1930–1985) Danube river sailor, born in the former Czechoslovakia
Mother: Valerie Szabo (1930–1985) elementary school teacher, born in Hungary.
Wife: Martha Visnyei (born: May 31, 1962 in Szeged, Hungary) retired Hungarian athlete, who was Hungary national champion six times in singles and thirteen times in teams, from 1985 to 1999.
Brother: Gabor Borka (born: August 19, 1961 in Budapest, Hungary) retired Hungarian kayaker, who was four times Hungary national champion.

References

1959 births
Hungarian male long-distance runners
Athletes (track and field) at the 1992 Summer Olympics
Olympic athletes of Hungary
Athletes from Budapest
Living people
Hungarian male marathon runners
20th-century Hungarian people